This article shows the K League records and statistics based on the "K League Data Portal". K League officially includes records of K League 1, K League 2 and Korean League Cup in its statistics regardless of competition levels and formats.

Players in bold are still playing in the K League.

Record holders

Appearances

Clean sheets

Goals

Assists

See also
K League
K League Top Scorer Award
K League Top Assists Award

References

External links